The French Congo worm lizard (Cynisca bifrontalis) is a worm lizard species in the family Amphisbaenidae. It is endemic to Gabon.

References

Cynisca (lizard)
Reptiles described in 1906
Taxa named by George Albert Boulenger
Endemic fauna of Gabon
Reptiles of Gabon